Rochdale power station supplied electricity to the town of Rochdale, Lancashire from 1901 to the 1958. The coal-fired power station was owned and operated by Rochdale Corporation prior to the nationalisation of the British electricity industry in 1948. It was redeveloped as demand for electricity grew and old plant was replaced, and had an ultimate generating capacity of 10.7 MW in the 1920s. The station closed on 1 April 1958.

History
In 1898 Rochdale Corporation applied for a Provisional Order under the Electric Lighting Acts to generate and supply electricity to the town. This was granted by the Board of Trade and was confirmed by Parliament through the Electric Lighting Orders Confirmation (No. 6) Act 1898 (61 & 62 Vict. c. xcii). The Corporation built a power station at the junction of Bridge Street (now Mellor Street) and Dane Street, Rochdale (53°36′53"N, 2°9′58″W) adjacent to the River Roch, and first supplied electricity to the town in 1901.

The power station supplied electricity for the Rochdale Corporation Tramways which operated a tramway service from 1901 to 1932.

By 1923 the generating capacity of the station was 10,736 kW. The Central Electricity Board constructed the national grid (1927–33) to connect power stations and their electricity supply systems within a region. The Rochdale system was connected to Lancashire Electric Power Company system in the mid-1920s. Larger modern power stations could generate electricity more efficiently than relatively small local stations such as Rochdale.

Rochdale Corporation continued as the owner of the power station and electricity supply system until nationalisation of the British electricity industry in 1948. Under nationalisation the Rochdale electricity undertaking was abolished, ownership of the power station was vested in the British Electricity Authority, and subsequently the Central Electricity Authority and the Central Electricity Generating Board (CEGB). At the same time the electricity distribution and sales responsibilities of the Rochdale electricity undertaking were transferred to the Merseyside & North Wales Electricity Board (MANWEB).

The power station produced an income for the corporation. Revenue from sales of current was £184,870 (1922) and £179,480 (1923). The surplus of revenue over expenses £49,127 (1922) and £43,940 (1923).

The power station continued to operate for another decade after nationalisation until it was closed on 1 April 1958 and was subsequently demolished. The site has been redeveloped with commercial premises.

Technical specification
By 1923 the generating plant comprised:

 Coal-fired boilers supplying 141,000 lb/h (17.8 kg/s) of steam to:
 Generators
 3 × 412 kW reciprocating engines and direct current generator sets
 1 × 500 kW reciprocating engine and DC generator set
 3 × 1,000 turbo-alternators AC
 2 × 3,000 turbo-alternators AC

These machines had a total generating capacity of 10,736 kW, of which 1,736 kW was DC and 9,000 kW alternating current.

Electricity supplies were available to consumers at:

 3-phase 50 HZ AC at 400 and 230 V
 DC at 440 and 220 volts
 DC traction current 500 volts

The final use of electricity over the period 1921–23 was:

The electricity system operating parameters were:

In the year 1946 Rochdale power station supplied 996,865 MWh of electricity, the maximum load was 8,110 kW.

See also
 Timeline of the UK electricity supply industry
 List of power stations in England

References

Coal-fired power stations in England
Demolished power stations in the United Kingdom
Former power stations in England
Buildings and structures in Rochdale